Joey Murcia Jr. (born April 25, 1979), known professionally as Giuseppe Andrews is an American former actor, screenwriter, director, and singer-songwriter known for his roles as Lex in the 1999 film Detroit Rock City, a bizarre sheriff's deputy in Cabin Fever (2002), a small role in Never Been Kissed (1999), as well as appearances in The Smashing Pumpkins videos "1979" and "Perfect".

Andrews has been involved in writing, directing, scoring, editing, shooting and producing a number of avant-garde films, and has directed several experimental independent movies. As of 2015, Andrews' whereabouts are unknown and he has ceased acting and songwriting.

Biography
Andrews was born Joey Murcia Jr. in Key Largo, Florida. His cinéma vérité-meets-exploitation filmmaking style has been compared to that of John Waters and Harmony Korine. He grew up in trailer parks, which feature prominently, along with their inhabitants, in many of his films. He also spent time living in a van with his father before they were both cast in an infomercial, which led to more acting jobs for Giuseppe.

Director Adam Rifkin has said of Andrews "Giuseppe Andrews is the most ferociously original filmmaker working in cinema today. No matter what new things he tries, everything is always signature Giuseppe Andrews. He is a true auteur." Rifkin also directed a documentary about Andrews, titled Giuseppe Makes a Movie.

Andrews reprised his role as a sheriff's deputy in the Cabin Fever sequel Cabin Fever 2: Spring Fever (2016).

He also appeared in the ninth season of CSI: Crime Scene Investigation, in the episode titled "Let It Bleed".

Andrews disappeared from the public eye in 2015.

Filmography

Director
 Touch Me in the Morning (1999)
 In Our Garden (2002)
 Trailer Town (2003)
 Dad's Chicken (2003)
 Air Conditioning (2003)
 Wiggly Harris (2003)
 After School Specials (2003)
 Monkey (2004)
 Actor (2004)
 Babysitter (2004)
 The Date Movie (2004)
 Who Flung Poo? (2004)
 Dribble (2004)
 Tater Tots (2004) 
 Period Piece (2004) 
 5th Wheel (2005)
 Gwank (2005)
 Grandpa (2005)
 Jacuzzi Rooms (2006)
 Doily's Summer of Freak Occurrences (2006)
 Long Row to Hoe (2006)
 Cross Breeze (2006)
 Okie Dokie (2007)
 Garbanzo Gas (2007)
 Cat Piss (2007)
 Golden Embers (2007)
 Holiday Weekend (2007)
 Everlasting Pine (2007)
 Orzo (2008)
 It's All Not So Tragic (2008)
 Schoof (2008)
 Airplane Pillows (2008)
 The Check Out (2009)
 Esoterica (2009)
 Zoo Dung Zero (2009)
 The Fast (2010)
 Diary (2011)
 Love-Seat: A Portrait of Self (2011)
 Only the Music Tells Me Where to Go (2012)
 Pure Artisti Dal (2013)
 Sex Acid (2013)
 The Fire Dancers (2013)
 Closet Africa (2013)
 Birth of the Pool (2013)
 Tugboat (2013)
 Doll Bottle (2014)
 Homo Robot Paradise Slob (2014)
 Pregnant with a Swastika (2014)
 Japanese Confusion (2014)
 Coffee Cake (2014)
 Vagrant Womb (2014)
 Ninos (2014)
 Give Me Cinema or Give Me Death (2014)

Actor

 1989 Getting It Right as Luke (as Joey Andrews)
 1995 Sleepstalker as Young Sandman (as Joey Andrews)
 1995 White Dwarf (TV Movie) as Never the Shifter / Doug (as Joey Andrews)
 1995 Unstrung Heroes as Ash
 1996 Independence Day as Troy
 1998 American History X as Jason
 1998 Pleasantville as Howard
 1999 The Other Sister as Trevor, Tough Guy
 1999 Never Been Kissed as Denominator
 1999 Detroit Rock City as Lex
 1999 Touch Me in the Morning as Coney Island
 1999-2001 Two Guys, a Girl and a Pizza Place (TV Series) as 'Germ'
 2002 Local Boys as Willy
 2002 Boston Public (TV Series) as Bobby Mendoza
 2002 Cabin Fever as Deputy Winston
 2003 After School Specials (TV Series)
 2003 Wiggly Harris
 2004 Tater Tots
 2004 Period Piece (Short)
 2005 Neo Ned as Josh
 2005 Tweek City as Bill Jensen
 2005 2001 Maniacs as Harper Alexander
 2006 Period Piece
 2006 The Minor Accomplishments of Jackie Woodman (TV Series) as Mike Ackerman
 2007 Look as Willie
 2007 Homo Erectus as Zig
 2007 The Go-Getter
 2007 Careless as Young Male Addict
 2008 Schoof
 2009 Cabin Fever 2: Spring Fever as Deputy Winston
 2011 From the Head as Ramone

Discography 
 Giants – self-released
 Night Owl Vol. 2 – self-released
 Night Owl Vol. 1 – self-released
 Race Cars – self-released
 Hobo Jungle – self-released
 Chow Mein Noodle CD (2003) – self-released
 Night Owl (2005) – self-released
 Me for All You (2006) – self-released
 Laroo (2006) – self-released
 Waiting Room (2007) – self-released
 Open Mic (2008) – self-released
 Reason (2009) – self-released
 Umami (2010) – self-released
 Stranger Than a Dream Vol 1 (2010) – self-released
 Stranger Than a Dream Vol 2 (2010) – self-released
 Sumami e.p. (2010) – self-released

Dates of some release are unknown, albums are available to buy on his website and iTunes.

References

External links

Giuseppe Andrews at MySpace
An Interview with Giuseppe Andrews
2007 Q&A w/PollyStaffle.com

American male film actors
Male actors from Florida
1979 births
Living people
People from Key Largo, Florida
Film directors from Florida
20th-century American male actors
21st-century American male actors